Another Day At The Office is a DVD of disc jockey Tiësto released in 2003. The DVD showcases his time on tour of some of the most popular dance venues in the world. It follows Tiësto beginning in Summer 2002 through his final DJ performance of 2002, New Year's Eve in New York City. Also captured in this documentary is live footage from his performances, interviews, live appearances, and music videos.

Video listing

Additional Release Material

Production Interviews
D.J. Tiësto - Star

Featurettes
Extended Scenes
Report From Atlanta
Behind-the-Scenes
Kritvibes

Interactive Features

Scene Access

Music Videos
Flight 643
Lethal Industry

Text/Photo Galleries

Biographies
D.J. Tiësto - Star

Discographies
D.J. Tiësto - Star

References

External links
 

Tiësto video albums
2003 video albums
Live video albums
2003 live albums